Jordan Miller may refer to:

 Jordan Miller (figure skater), American figure skater
 Jordan Miller (defensive tackle) (born 1988), American football nose tackle
 Jordan Miller (cornerback) (born 1997), American football cornerback
 Jordan Miller, lead singer & bass player for Canadian rock band The Beaches